The Lusatian Neisse (Upper Sorbian: Łužiska Nysa; Lower Sorbian: Łužyska Nysa), or Western Neisse, is a  river in northern Central Europe. It rises in the Jizera Mountains, near Nová Ves nad Nisou, at the Czech border becoming the Polish–German border for its remaining , to flow into the similarly northward-flowing Oder.

The river reaches the tripoint of the three nations by Zittau, a German town/city, after , leaving the Czech Republic. It is a left-bank tributary of the Oder, into which it flows between Neißemünde-Ratzdorf and Kosarzyn – north of the towns of Guben and Gubin.

Since the 1945 Potsdam Agreement in the aftermath of World War II, the river has partially demarcated the German-Polish border (along the Oder-Neisse line). While the German population outside was expelled.

It is the longest and most watered of the three rivers of its non-adjectival name in both the main languages (the two other rivers being the Eastern Neisse and Raging Neisse (Polish: Nysa Szalona; German: Wütende Neiße or Jauersche Neiße)). It is usually simply referred to as the Neisse.

Name
Since the river runs through the historic region of Lusatia, the adjective "Lusatian" or "Western" before the name of the river Neisse is used whenever differentiating this border river from the Eastern Neisse (Polish: Nysa Kłodzka, German: Glatzer Neisse) and the smaller Raging Neisse (Polish: Nysa Szalona; German: Wütende Neisse or Jauersche Neisse), both in Poland.

Towns and villages
At Bad Muskau the Neisse flows through Muskau Park, a UNESCO World Heritage Site. Cities and towns on the river from source to mouth include:
 Jablonec nad Nisou, Czech Republic
 Vratislavice, Czech Republic
 Liberec, Czech Republic
 Chrastava, Czech Republic
 Hrádek nad Nisou, Czech Republic
 Zittau, Germany
 Bogatynia, Poland
 Görlitz, Germany; Zgorzelec, Poland
 Pieńsk, Poland
 Bad Muskau, Germany; Łęknica, Poland
 Forst (Lausitz), Germany
 Guben, Germany; Gubin, Poland

Tributaries
Right bank:
 Lubsza

Left bank:
 Mandau

See also
 List of rivers of the Czech Republic
 List of rivers of Germany
 List of rivers of Poland

References

External links

 Bibliography on Water Resources and International Law Peace Palace Library
 Closed Germany-Poland bridges

 
International rivers of Europe
Rivers of Poland
Rivers of Lower Silesian Voivodeship
Rivers of Lubusz Voivodeship
Rivers of the Liberec Region
Rivers of Brandenburg
Rivers of Saxony
Jablonec nad Nisou District
Liberec District
Geography of Lusatia
Germany–Poland border
Federal waterways in Germany
Border rivers
Rivers of Germany